The year 2016 was the second year in the history of the Rizin Fighting Federation, a mixed martial arts promotion based in Japan. 2016 started with Rizin Fighting Federation 1. It started broadcasting through a television agreement with Fuji Television.

Background
On July 16, 2016 Nobuyuki Sakakibara announced at a press conference that Rizin Fighting Federation will host a 16-man openweight tournament September 25 in Tokyo.
2006 Pride Open-Weight Grand Prix Champion Mirko Cro Cop and former PRIDE Middleweight Champion Wanderlei Silva to participate in the tournament.

This tournament was included Pride FC veterans like Kazuyuki Fujita, Tsuyoshi Kosaka, Heath Herring, Sumo sensation Baruto Kaito, world class wrestler Amir Aliakbari, and Rizin GP 2015 winner King Mo

Cro Cop won the championship.

List of events

Rizin Openweight Grand Prix 2016 bracket

1Jiří Procházka was injured and couldn't participate in the second round of the Grand Prix, and was subsequently replaced by Tsuyoshi Kohsaka.

2Wanderlei Silva retired from the tournament, was replaced by Muhammed Lawal.

3Shane Carwin withdrew from the tournament, was replaced by Heath Herring.

Rizin 1 

 Rizin Fighting Federation 1  was a mixed martial arts event held by the Rizin Fighting Federation on April 4, 2016 at the Nippon Gaishi Hall in Nagoya, Japan.

Results

Rizin World Grand Prix 2016: 1st Round

 Rizin World Grand-Prix 2016: 1st Round  was a mixed martial arts event held by the Rizin Fighting Federation on September 25, 2016 at the Saitama Super Arena in Saitama, Japan.

Results

Rizin World Grand Prix 2016: 2nd Round

 Rizin World Grand-Prix 2016: 2nd Round  was a mixed martial arts event held by the Rizin Fighting Federation on December 29, 2016 at the Saitama Super Arena in Saitama, Japan.

Background

Jiří Procházka was injured and couldn't participate in the second round of the Grand Prix, and was subsequently replaced by Tsuyoshi Kohsaka.

Mirko Cro Cop was originally scheduled to have a rematch with Wanderlei Silva in the Openweight Grand-Prix Quarter-Finals. However, on December 2, Silva withdrew from the bout. He was subsequently replaced by Muhammed Lawal.

Shane Carwin was originally announced as an Openweight entrant against Amir Aliakbari. However, he pulled out of the tournament for undisclosed reasons and was replaced by Heath Herring.

Results

Rizin World Grand Prix 2016: Final Round

 Rizin World Grand-Prix 2016: Final Round  was a mixed martial arts event held by the Rizin Fighting Federation on December 31, 2016 at the Saitama Super Arena in Saitama, Japan.
 
Background

Charles Bennett was originally set to fight against Minoru Kimura. However, Bennett withdrew from the bout due to problems obtaining a visa. Shinobu Kandori was originally set to take on Gabi Garcia, but was replaced by Yumiko Hotta after suffering a rib injury.

Results

References

External links
 http://www.rizinff.com/en/
 http://www.tapology.com/search?term=rizin&mainSearchFilter=events

Rizin Fighting Federation
2016 in mixed martial arts
2016 in Japanese sport